The Smith House is a historic house at 607 West Arch Avenue in Searcy, Arkansas.   Built in 1920, it is a rare local example of a prefabricated mail order house, produced by the Sears, Roebuck company as model #264P202 of the Sears Modern Homes.  It is a two-story frame structure, with a side gable roof and novelty siding.  The roof has extended eaves with exposed rafters and large brackets in the gable ends, and there is a projecting gable section in the center of the front facade.  A porch wraps around to the left of this section, its shed roof supported by brick piers.

The house was listed on the National Register of Historic Places in 1991.

See also
National Register of Historic Places listings in White County, Arkansas

References

Houses on the National Register of Historic Places in Arkansas
Houses completed in 1920
Houses in Searcy, Arkansas
National Register of Historic Places in Searcy, Arkansas
1920 establishments in Arkansas
Sears Modern Homes